Benjamin F. Cockrill Jr. (1866–1936) was an American farmer and politician.

Early life
Benjamin F. Cockrill Jr. was born in Tennessee in 1866. His father, Benjamin F. Cockrill, was the son of Mark R. Cockrill, a planter known as the "Wool King of the World". His paternal grandfather, John Cockrill, was a settler in Nashville, and his paternal great-grandfather, John Cockrill, was a Welsh-born planter of Scottish descent. His mother, Sarah "Sallie" Foster, was the daughter of Senator Ephraim H. Foster.

Cockrill graduated from Washington and Lee University with a bachelor of arts degree in 1883.

Career
Cockrill was a farmer in Nashville. He raised stock in Warrenton, Virginia from 1890 to 1896, only to return to his Nashville farm. He established a new farm in West Nashville in 1902.

Cockrill was a member of the Democratic Party. He served as a member of the Tennessee House of Representatives from 1902 to 1905, representing Davidson County.

Personal life and death
Cockrill married Willie Christen on November 26, 1887. They had two sons and two daughters. He was a member of the West Nashville Presbyterian Church, the Knights of Pythias, and the Royal Arcanum.

Cockrill died on March 3, 1936. He was buried at the Mount Olivet Cemetery in Nashville, Tennessee.

References

1866 births
1936 deaths
American people of Scottish descent
People from Nashville, Tennessee
Washington and Lee University alumni
Farmers from Tennessee
Democratic Party members of the Tennessee House of Representatives
People from Warrenton, Virginia